Daşdəmirbəyli  (also, Daşdəmir, Dashdamirbegli, and Dashdemirbeyli) is a village and municipality in the Agsu Rayon of Azerbaijan.  It has a population of 915.

References 

Populated places in Agsu District